NPC (each letter separately; also known as the NPC Wojak), derived from non-player character, is an internet meme that represents people who do not think for themselves or do not make their own decisions; those who lack intrapersonal communication.
The NPC meme, which graphically is based on the Wojak meme, was created in July 2016 by an anonymous author and first published on the imageboard 4chan, where the idea and inspiration behind the meme were introduced.

The NPC meme gained widespread attention and in October 2018 was covered in numerous news outlets, including The New York Times, The Verge, and the BBC. In 2022, the meme garnered popularity on video sharing service TikTok.

History
In 2016, the concept was revived in a 4chan post by an anonymous user who initiated the NPC meme, titled "Are you an NPC?", detailing the behaviour of individuals acting similarly to non-player characters in video games by repeatedly using phrases such as "JUST BE YOURSELF", and ended the post with the following description of people the NPC meme intends to depict.

The design of the NPC meme character is based on Wojak, a meme created in Microsoft Paint in 2010. Unlike the NPC meme, the Wojak meme (also known as Feels Guy) appeared first on the image hosting website vichan and has mainly been used for expression of feelings, most often melancholy or regret.

During the weeks leading up to the 2018 midterm elections in the United States, the NPC meme gained remarkable attention, with relatively high media coverage, publication of new NPC memes online, and several noticeable events. A large number of animated videos based on the NPC meme were uploaded to YouTube in the second half of October 2018, and Google searches for the term "NPC Wojak" peaked around the same time. In October 2018, a large number of Twitter accounts were created which presented themselves as NPCs, and more than 1,500 such accounts were subsequently banned by Twitter. In November, InfoWars held a competition promoting creation of NPC memes. The winning entry, by a Twitter user named "Carpe Donktum", was later retweeted by then-U.S. President Donald Trump on February 2019 before it was removed for copyright infringement. The re-election campaign for then-Iowa Representative Steve King also tweeted an NPC meme around the same time, aimed at the sitting Democratic members of Congress. 

The number of searches for the search term "NPC Wojak" remained relatively constant during 2019, though at a level significantly lower than its peak from early October through mid November 2018.

Although the NPC meme was created 6 years after the Wojak meme, the NPC meme rapidly gained attention in comparison with the Wojak meme. On the website of the meme community Know Your Meme, the NPC meme has 858,000 page views, 33 videos, 597 images and 749 comments as of December 31, 2019. This can be compared to the Wojak meme on which NPC is based, which has 787,000 page views, 6 videos, 332 images and 47 comments as of December 31, 2019. A subreddit exclusively for "right wing, political" NPC memes without "extremist content" called r/NPCMemes was created on October 10, 2018.

In 2022, a variation of the NPC meme called "I Support The Current Thing" was popularized. According to Slate, the meme is mainly used by the political right to mock liberals for "perceived conformism, frivolousness, and distractibility" who "blindly flit from news story to news story, issue to issue, changing their Facebook profile pics and Twitter display names to 'support' whatever 'Current Thing' dominates news and commentary. The current thing has been Ukraine, essential workers, the Women's March, Notre Dame after it caught on fire, etc." In March 2022, Elon Musk tweeted a version of the meme.

Characteristics

In appearance, the NPC character is grey in color, and usually short in stature simple in its design, with an expressionless face, a triangular nose and a blank stare. The shape of the NPC face resembles that of Wojak, and is drawn crudely.

The initial NPC refers to non-player character, a term used in video-games for characters the player cannot control. As such, a non-player character in a game is controlled by the computer, and typically interacts with the player through simple and repetitive actions, such as communicating the same sentence each time the player approaches the NPC. As such, NPCs have "no internality, agency, or capacity for critical thought", they rely on scripted lines and do not think by themselves. Following the analogy of non-player characters, the NPC meme is used to mock individuals the maker perceives as lacking those attributes, generally political opponents.  The NPC responds using simple dialogue resembling video game NPCs, with no capability for discussion. Due to NPC memes' greater popularity among the political right, the NPC is generally portrayed as parroting left-wing positions. Despite being co-opted by right-wing movements to "mock leftists," both left- and right-wing NPC variants exist. 

•⎳• is an emoticon version of the NPC meme.

Media coverage
The NPC meme has been featured in major and minor news outlets alike, with frequent coverage during the peak of the NPCs popularity in fall 2018. According to The Verge, a few articles (including one by The New York Times published on October 16, 2018) sparked a "domino effect" and led to increased spread of the meme on Twitter, YouTube and through articles.

Notable events

Twitter mass ban
In October 2018, users of r/The_Donald, a large subreddit that supported United States President Donald Trump, coordinated in creating accounts presented as NPCs on the American microblogging and social networking service Twitter. According to The Week, the accounts spread "bland, politically correct messages intended to mimic and provoke liberal pronouncements". Following the mass creation of NPC Twitter accounts, the term "NPC" was used over 30,000 times on Twitter in a time span of 24 hours. Twitter responded to the event by banning more than 1,500 of its users presenting themselves as NPCs. The created accounts typically used profile pictures of NPC with slight modifications, such as colorful hair or partially covering masks. According to one or more anonymous sources quoted by The Week and The New York Times, the users were banned for violating a term of use by Twitter against "intentionally misleading election-related content", ahead of the United States 2018 midterm election. The claim that NPC memes were used to spread misinformation about the 2018 United States midterm election is also reported by other news agencies, including The Verge, BBC and The Independent. The decision by Twitter to remove NPC accounts has upset many conservatives according to BBC.

Billboard defacing
In 2019, the NPC meme was used in the modification of two existing billboards in the United States.

On January 13, 2019, the conservative street artist group The Faction modified a billboard featuring American comedian Bill Maher in West Hollywood using the NPC meme.

On February 19, 2019, a similar modification was performed on a billboard featuring English comedian John Oliver in Los Angeles, in which the face of Oliver was replaced by that of an NPC, and text "Last Week Tonight with John Oliver" was replaced by "The Orange Man Bad Show with John Oliver". The modified billboard also included the text "*MATRIX APPROVED NPC PROGRAMMING" and a speech balloon from the NPC containing words such as "CHEETOH" and "DRUMPH" with random symbols in green text, resembling the text shown in The Matrix. According to The Daily Dot, the modification of the billboard featuring Oliver, also credited to The Faction, was an attempt to counteract the media's supposed "Trump derangement syndrome".

See also

 List of Internet phenomena
 Philosophical zombie – a philosophical thought experiment that imagines a being which appears to display consciousness but is actually not conscious.
 Solipsism - the philosophical idea that only one's mind is sure to exist.
 Brain in a vat - a similar philosophical thought experiment.

Notes

References

External links
 NPC at Know Your Meme
 NPC Meme Generator
 NPC Memes at Reddit

Internet memes introduced in 2016
Satire
Politics of the United States
4chan phenomena
2010s fads and trends
2020s fads and trends
Political Internet memes
Internet-related controversies